Hellinsia albilobata is a moth of the family Pterophoridae. It is found in North America, including the Northwest Territories.

The forewings are deep smoky grey with a slight sprinkling of white scaling. There is a broad band of white scaling extending along the inner margin, extending over the entire second lobe and the lower half of the first lobe. There is also a faint dark spot in the cell and another, more distinct, at the base of the cleft. The hindwings are concolorous with the forewings.

References

albilobata
Moths described in 1939
Moths of North America
Taxa named by James Halliday McDunnough